Microhydranencephaly (MHAC) is a severe abnormality of brain development characterized by both microcephaly and hydranencephaly. Signs and symptoms may include severe microcephaly, scalp rugae (a series of ridges), and profound intellectual disability. Familial occurrence of the condition is very rare but it has been reported in a few families. It has been suggested that some cases MHAC are inherited in an autosomal recessive manner via a loss-of-function mutation of the gene NDE1.

Notable cases 
 Jaxon Buell  was born on August 27, 2014 with 80% of his brain, and most of his skull, missing. He surpassed all doctors' expectations, who did not expect him to live to his second birthday. He died at five years old.

References 

Rare diseases
Congenital disorders of nervous system